The Department of Immigration, Population Growth and Skills is a provincial government department in Newfoundland and Labrador, Canada. The department is headed by a member of the provincial cabinet, typically a Member of the House of Assembly, who is chosen by the premier and formally appointed by the Lieutenant-Governor of Newfoundland and Labrador. The current Minister of Immigration, Population Growth and Skills is Gerry Byrne.

The department was created in October 2011 as the Department of Advanced Education, Skills, and Labour, by the government of Kathy Dunderdale, and incorporates most of the former Department of Human Resources, Labour and Employment as well as the advanced studies component of the Department of Education. In 2020, the department was reconfigured as Immigration, Skills and Labour.

Ministers
Key:

See also
Executive Council of Newfoundland and Labrador

References

External links
Department of Immigration, Population Growth and Skills

Newfoundland and Labrador government departments and agencies
Newfoundland